The Libertarian Party of Pennsylvania (LPPA) is the Pennsylvania affiliate of the Libertarian Party. Since March 2022, it has been chaired by Rob Cowburn.

Leadership

LPPA Platform

The party believes that each individual must be free to do as she or he pleases as long as she or he does not infringe upon the equal right of others.  Another tenet is that force must not be used on an individual, unless that individual has initiated the use of force or fraud.  The party also believes that only those laws that are consistent with the purpose of the government to protect and secure individuals' rights should be utilized by the government.

Elected officeholders

The Libertarian Party of Pennsylvania has had many candidates elected to city and county positions throughout Pennsylvania.  There are currently 155 elected Libertarian officeholders in Pennsylvania.

Electoral performance

Federal elections

U.S. President

U.S. Senate

References

External links
 Libertarian Party of Pennsylvania
 Libertarian Party of Chester County
 Libertarian Party of Bucks County
 Libertarian Party of Philadelphia
 Libertarian Party of Lancaster County
 Northampton County Libertarian Party
 Libertarian Party of Snyder County
 Libertarian Party of Monroe County
 Libertarian Party of Montgomery County
 Libertarian Party of Delaware County
 Libertarian Party of Allegheny County
 Libertarian Party of Butler County
 [Matrix]

Pennsylvania
Political parties in Pennsylvania